Park Chul-sung (born 21 November 1955) is a South Korean sport shooter who competed in the 1984 Summer Olympics, in the 1988 Summer Olympics and in the 1996 Summer Olympics.

References

1955 births
Living people
South Korean male sport shooters
Trap and double trap shooters
Olympic shooters of South Korea
Shooters at the 1984 Summer Olympics
Shooters at the 1988 Summer Olympics
Shooters at the 1996 Summer Olympics
Medalists at the 1986 Asian Games
Medalists at the 1994 Asian Games
Shooters at the 1986 Asian Games
Shooters at the 1994 Asian Games
Asian Games medalists in shooting
Asian Games silver medalists for South Korea
Asian Games bronze medalists for South Korea
20th-century South Korean people
21st-century South Korean people